Ocean Hall is a historic house located in Bushwood, St. Mary's County, Maryland, U.S.  The house is believed to have been built in 1703. Successive alterations were made to the initial structure in the early 18th, late 19th and early 20th centuries, when the exterior porches were added. Of the original house only the Flemish bond brick exterior walls remain.

It is believed that when the interior was rebuilt (or extensively altered) about 1725, the floor plan configuration was a hall and parlor, a two-room plan typical of this region throughout the early 18th centuries. Decorative details include paneling, molded chair-rails, and a Federal mantel.

Ocean Hall was listed on the National Register of Historic Places in 1973.

References

External links
, including undated photo, at Maryland Historical Trust

Houses on the National Register of Historic Places in Maryland
Houses in St. Mary's County, Maryland
Houses completed in 1670
Federal architecture in Maryland
Hall and parlor houses
Historic American Buildings Survey in Maryland
1670 establishments in Maryland
National Register of Historic Places in St. Mary's County, Maryland